Kristin J. Forbes (born August 21, 1970) is an American economist. She is the Jerome and Dorothy Lemelson Professor of Management and Global Economics at the MIT Sloan School of Management.

Early life
The eldest of three children, Forbes was raised in Concord, New Hampshire and attend Concord High School. In 1988, as a high school senior, she was selected as New Hampshire's Presidential Scholar, which gave her the opportunity to meet President Ronald Reagan at a ceremony in the White House Rose Garden.

Career
After graduating summa cum laude in 1992 with a B.A. with highest honors in Economics from Williams College, Forbes joined the investment banking division of Morgan Stanley as an analyst on Wall Street, New York City. In 1993, she joined the policy research department of the World Bank. While working on a study about Asia, she decided to concentrate on a career in economics.

She studied for a Ph.D. at Massachusetts Institute of Technology (MIT), during which she spent a summer in New Delhi, India, and then spent three months traveling throughout the country. She completed her Ph.D. in 1998 in international and development economics, and was hired by the MIT Sloan School of Management. While teaching, her post-doctorate studies focused on financial contagion, looking at how it spread from business-to-business.

Treasury department, CEA
In 2001, Forbes was hired by John B. Taylor, then the undersecretary of international affairs at the U.S. Treasury Department, to serve in the Office of International Affairs as the Deputy Assistant Secretary of Quantitative Policy Analysis and Latin American and Caribbean Nations. A year later she returned to MIT to teach and study. In 2003, she was approached by Gregory Mankiw, the head of the Council of Economic Advisors, and after confirmation by the U.S. Senate, she served until 2005 as the youngest-ever member of the President's CEA, in the administration of George W. Bush.

Return to academia
Forbes returned to academia in mid-2005 to take up her current position. She has since been researching financial crises, financial contagion, capital controls, macroprudential regulations, foreign investment and tax holidays. In August 2012 she presented the opening paper at the Federal Reserve's annual symposium in Jackson Hole, Wyoming, on the subject of financial contagion.

During this period, Forbes served as a member of the Governor's Council of Economic Advisers for the State of Massachusetts. She was also a member of the Trilateral Commission and sat on the Panel of Economic Advisers for the Congressional Budget Office, the Academic Advisory Board for the Peterson Institute for International Economics, and the Center for Global Development. She also became more involved in poverty reduction, and helped start DeWorm the World, along with Esther Duflo, Michael Kremer, and Rachel Glennerster, a non-profit organization which is now part of EvidenceAction and has supported programs deworming over 300 million children in Africa and Asia.

In May 2014, she was appointed to the United Kingdom's Bank of England Monetary Policy Committee, as an "external member", replacing Ben Broadbent. She delivered a number of influential speeches reflecting her "deep dives" on economic challenges facing the United Kingdom. She dissented on March 16, 2017, preferring to raise rates, arguing inflation could overshoot the 2% target. She is finished her term in June 2017, and returned to MIT's Sloan School of Management. She has won many teaching awards and her classes are among the most popular at Sloan. 

Forbes is currently a research associate at the NBER and research fellow at the CEPR. She replaced Barry Eichengreen as the Convener of the Bellagio Group in 2010 and is a member of the Aspen Economic Strategy Group and Council on Foreign Relations. She is also a member of the Economic Advisory Panel for the New York Federal Reserve Bank and Scientific Committee for the International Center for Monetary and Banking Studies.

Personal life
Forbes is married and has three children. She ran the Boston Marathon in 2014, for Boston Children's Hospital and earned qualifying time. She ran the London Marathon in 2016.

Honors
  Honorary Commander of the Order of the British Empire, 2019
Bicentennial Medal from Williams College to members of the community "for outstanding achievement in any field of endeavor", 2015.

References

External links
 MIT web site
 Article on Forbes in Finance & Development
 Article on Forbes on Bloomberg
 Article on Forbes in TheEditorial

1970 births
Living people
People from Concord, New Hampshire
Williams College alumni
Massachusetts Institute of Technology alumni
American women economists
Morgan Stanley employees
World Bank people
United States Council of Economic Advisers
MIT Sloan School of Management faculty
Group of Thirty
Economists from New Hampshire
21st-century American economists
Honorary Commanders of the Order of the British Empire